The Syrian Desert ( Bādiyat Ash-Shām), also known as the North Arabian Desert, the Jordanian steppe, or the Badiya, is a region of desert, semi-desert and steppe covering  of the Middle East, including parts of southern Syria, eastern Jordan, northern Saudi Arabia, and western Iraq. It accounts for 85% of the land area of Jordan and 55% of Syria. To the south it borders and merges into the Arabian Desert. The land is open, rocky or gravelly desert pavement, cut with occasional wadis.

Location and name 
The desert is bounded by the Orontes Valley and the volcanic field of Harrat al-Shamah to the west, and by the Euphrates to the east. In the north, the desert gives way to the more fertile areas and to the south it runs into the deserts of the Arabian Peninsula.

Some sources equate the Syrian Desert with the "Hamad Desert" while others limit the name Hamad to the southern central plateau. A few consider the Hamad to be the whole region and the Syrian Desert just the northern part.

Several parts of the Syrian Desert have been referred to separately such as the Palmyrene desert around Palmyra, and the Homs desert. The eastern section of the Syrian Desert, that within borders of Iraq, can be referred to (within Iraqi context) as the Western Desert.

The name Shamiyah has also been used for the Syrian Desert. The name has been translated in the past as Badiyat al-Sham (or Badiyat ash-Sham)

Geography 
The  region in the middle of the desert is the Hamad Plateau, a rather flat, stony semi-desert consisting of limestone bedrock covered with chert gravel. What little rain arrives on the plateau flows into local salt flats. The highest peaks of the Plateau are those of the + Khawr um Wual in Saudi Arabia, and the  Jebel Aneiza, at the border tripoint between Jordan, Iraq and Saudi Arabia.

Together with the other deserts of the Arabian Peninsula, the Hamad Desert has been described as one of the most arid deserts of the world.

Wildlife 
Some of the climax plants in the Syrian Badia are Caroxylon vermiculatum, Stipa barbata, Artemisia herba-alba and Atriplex leucoclada. This desert ecosystem is under threat from drought, over-grazing, hunting and other human activities. Some native animals no longer inhabit this area, and many plant species have died out while grasses with a lower nutritional value to livestock have replaced them.

The Syrian Desert is the origin of the golden hamster.

Storks, herons, cranes, small waders, waterfowl, and also raptors visit the seasonal lakes. Small rodents are common, as are their predators such as snakes, scorpions and camel spiders; previously common were gazelle, wolf, jackal, fox, cat and caracal, also ostrich, cheetah, hartebeest and onager. The large mammals are now locally extinct.

History

Ancient 

The desert was historically inhabited by Bedouin tribes, and many tribes still remain in the region, their members living mainly in towns and settlements built near oases.  Some Bedouin still maintain their traditional way of life in the desert. Safaitic inscriptions, proto-Arabic texts written by literate Bedouin, are found throughout the Syrian Desert. These date approximately from the first century BC to the fourth century AD.

One of the most important ancient settlements in the Syrian desert is Palmyra; first mentioned in the second millennium BC, the city was an important trading center in Roman times, and its people were renowned merchants who took advantage of its strategic position on the silk road linking the far east to the mediterranean, by taxing passing by caravans, establishing colonies on the silk road, and trading in the rare commodities from the far east, thus bringing enormous wealth to their city. 

Another important ancient settlement is the city of Dura-Europos on the Euphrates. Originally a fortress, it was founded during the Seleucid Empire and initially given the name Dura, which means "Fortress", but was called Europos by the Greeks. The combination Dura-Europos is a modern invention. The city prospered, mainly for its location on the Euphrates, importantly linking Mesopotamia to the Mediterranean, thus playing a huge part in both the commercial and military connections between the two regions. It was, however, raided by the Sasanian emperor Shapur I in the 250s, most of its citizens fled, and under Sasanian rule, the city was subsequently abandoned.

Modern 

During the Ottoman Empire's Armenian genocide, large numbers of victims were deported across the Euphrates River into the desert to die. The Syrian desert was first traversed by motor vehicle in 1919. During the Iraq War, the desert served as a major supply line for the Iraqi resistance, with the Iraq portion of the desert becoming a primary stronghold of the Sunni resistance operating in the Al Anbar Governorate, particularly after the Multi-National Force – Iraq capture of Fallujah during the Second Battle of Fallujah. A series of Coalition military operations were relatively ineffective at removing the insurgency presence in the Desert. As the resistance began to gain control of the surrounding areas, coalition spokesmen began to downplay the importance of the Syrian Desert as a center of operations; nevertheless the Syrian Desert remains one of the primary routes for smuggling equipment due to its location near the Syrian border. By September 2006 the resistance had gained control of virtually all of the Anbar Governorate and had moved most of their forces, equipment and leaders further east to resistance-controlled cities near the Euphrates river.

Economy and agriculture 
With low rainfall and poor quality soils, today the region is principally used as rangeland for livestock. Bedouin herdsmen, many of whom are still nomadic, graze about twelve million sheep and goats here, as well as a smaller number of camels.

The International Fund for Agricultural Development aims to alleviate rural poverty, and in 1995, in cooperation with the Syrian government, it started a project to rehabilitate over a million hectares of degraded land in the Syrian Badia. In some areas, when grazing was restricted, there was a spontaneous return of many of the native plants. In other areas which were more heavily degraded, grazing restrictions were supplemented by reseeding and the planting of fodder species. By the time the project ended in 2010, nearly a quarter of a million hectares had been reseeded, and nearly a hundred thousand hectares had been planted with native fodder shrubs. The result has been a great success, with some herdsmen reporting  tenfold increases in the productivity of their livestock.

Gallery

See also 
Arabian desert
Fertile Crescent
List of deserts by area

References 

Deserts of Syria
Deserts of Jordan
Deserts of Iraq
Eastern Mediterranean